The Arkansas Bar Association is the voluntary (non-mandatory) bar association of the U.S. state of Arkansas.

History 
As early as 1837, there were efforts to organize association of lawyers in Arkansas, but it was not until 1898 that the Arkansas State Bar was organized. Its first president was Uriah Milton Rose, whose name would come to grace the state's oldest and most prestigious legal enterprise, Rose Law Firm.

Structure
The Arkansas Bar Association publishes the quarterly Arkansas Lawyer Magazine,
the weekly "E-bulletins," and other publications.

The Arkansas Bar Association does not control lawyer licensing; that is a function of the Arkansas Board of Law Examiners. It does not enforce the requirement that Arkansas lawyers must complete 12 credits of Continuing Legal Education each year.; that is the function of the Arkansas Continuing Legal Education Board

References

American state bar associations
Government of Arkansas
1898 establishments in Arkansas
Organizations established in 1898